Vasyl Ivehesh (born 3 March 1961 in Vynohradiv, Zakarpattia Oblast, Ukrainian SSR) is a Ukrainian professional football coach and a former player.

Ivehesh after retiring as footballer became a manager in some amateur clubs. Also was a manager in the Czech Republic. From July 2012 he is the manager in the FC Ternopil, and in 2014 was promoted with club to the Ukrainian First League. His two sons, Andriy Ivehesh (born 1985) and Viktor Ivehesh (born 1987), are football players.

References

External links
Profile at Official FFU site (Ukr)
Profile at Soccerway

1961 births
Living people
People from Vynohradiv
Soviet footballers
Ukrainian footballers
Ukrainian football managers
Ukrainian expatriate football managers
FC Podillya Khmelnytskyi players
FC Nyva Ternopil players
FC Dnister Zalishchyky players
FC Dnister Zalishchyky managers
FC Krystal Chortkiv managers
FC Ternopil managers
Association football midfielders
Ukrainian expatriate sportspeople in the Czech Republic
Expatriate football managers in the Czech Republic
Sportspeople from Zakarpattia Oblast